Virginia's 8th congressional district is a United States congressional district in the Commonwealth of Virginia.  It comprises all of Arlington County, portions of Fairfax County and all of the independent cities of Alexandria and Falls Church.

The residents of the 8th district are currently represented by Democratic Congressman Don Beyer, elected in November 2014.  With a Cook Partisan Voting Index of D+27, it is the most Democratic district in Virginia, and one of the most Democratic white-majority districts in the South.

Being next to Washington D.C., the district is heavily dependent upon Federal government employment – for instance it has the highest Pentagon spending of any congressional district in the United States.

Election results from presidential  races

Geography
Encompassing much of Northern Virginia's close-in suburbs of Washington, D.C., Virginia's 8th District includes Arlington County, parts of Fairfax County, and the independent cities of Alexandria and Falls Church.

Demographics
As of 2000, the district has 643,503 residents, 13.7% are African American, 9.5% are Asian, 16.4% are Hispanic and 64.5% are white.

Virginia's eighth congressional district is traditionally a Democratic stronghold, most notably in the urban communities of Arlington and Alexandria.

Elections since 1960

1960s

1970s

1980s

1990s

2000s

2010s

2020s

List of members representing the district

Historical district boundaries

See also

Virginia's congressional districts
List of United States congressional districts

References

Further reading

 Congressional Biographical Directory of the United States 1774–present

08
Northern Virginia
Alexandria, Virginia
Arlington County, Virginia
Government in Fairfax County, Virginia
Washington metropolitan area
Constituencies established in 1789
1789 establishments in Virginia
Constituencies disestablished in 1933
1933 disestablishments in Virginia
Constituencies established in 1935
1935 establishments in Virginia